Love and Thieves (German: Liebe und Diebe) is a 1928 German silent drama film directed by Carl Froelich and Henny Porten,  Anton Pointner and Adolphe Engers. The film's art direction was by Franz Schroedter. It premiered at the Ufa-Palast am Zoo and was distributed by UFA as part of the Parufamet agreement.

Cast
 Henny Porten as Anna von Belling  
 Anton Pointner as Gerd von Langen, Kriminalkommissar  
 Adolphe Engers as Mertens, Kriminalassistent 
 Paul Bildt as Smirnoff, Staatsrat a.D.  
 Kurt Gerron as Hüsgens, Fabrikant  
 Michael Mar as Der Hoteldirektor  
 Max Ralph-Ostermann as Der Polizeichef 
 Carl Geppert as 1. Ehemann  
 Oreste Bilancia as 2. Ehemann  
 Hubert von Meyerinck as 3. Ehemann 
 Ellen Kürti

References

Bibliography
 Grange, William. Cultural Chronicle of the Weimar Republic. Scarecrow Press, 2008.

External links

1928 films
Films of the Weimar Republic
Films directed by Carl Froelich
German silent feature films
German black-and-white films
UFA GmbH films
German drama films
1928 drama films
Silent drama films
1920s German films